WNGZ (1490 kHz) is an AM radio station licensed to serve Watkins Glen, New York. The station is owned by Seven Mountains Media. The station, which has historically been prone to numerous format changes in the past decade, previously carried a classic country format.

FM translators
The following FM translators simulcast WNGZ and are used in the station branding. It also provides high fidelity stereophonic sound for the format.

History
The station originally signed on in 1968 as WGMF (Watkins Glen/Montour Falls), a daytime-only station on 1500 kHz (the same frequency as clear channel WTOP in Washington). The station later moved to 1490 kHz to broadcast 24 hours a day. In the late 1980s, while still a daytimer, WCMF simulcast the signal from WNGZ (104.9 FM, licensed to nearby Montour Falls but targeted to the Elmira-Corning audience), which, due to topography, had poor reception in Watkins Glen. In 1990 WGMF originated a locally programmed oldies format as "Famous 1490". In 2004, the station aired an adult standards format as WTYX. The station was assigned the WRCE call letters by the Federal Communications Commission on January 22, 2008.

WRCE's tower collapsed on December 14, 2009, killing a worker and causing the station to go silent. A new tower was constructed in 2010 by chief engineer Benjamin Van Patten.

From June 30 to July 4, 2011, WRCE ran a simulcast of "The Bunny", a temporary radio station run by the band Phish for their weekend long Superball IX concert festival at Watkins Glen International, also run on Sirius XM's Jam On station and the Phish website. The station had an eclectic mix of music from Phish and other artists, and had a live broadcast all eight sets of music performed by Phish over the weekend.

Along with the rest of Backyard Broadcasting's New York assets, WRCE was sold to Community Broadcasters, LLC effective August 26, 2013 at a price of $3.6 million.

Shortly after purchasing the station, Community Broadcasters ended the simulcast of 104.9 WNGZ and its affiliation with the Motor Racing Network, Performance Racing Network, Indy Racing Network, and Watkins Glen International Raceway. The station carried the ESPN Radio Network for a very short period in 2014 before the station switched formats to a satellite-provided classic country format also in 2014.

In 2019, Community Broadcasters sold its New York assets to Seven Mountains Media. On July 3, 2020, WRCE adopted an active rock format branded "Wingz 93" and its call sign was changed to WNGZ, absorbing the format and call sign of the former WNGZ on FM 104.9 when that station was sold off to a religious broadcaster.

References

External links
WNGZ official website

NGZ (AM)
Radio stations established in 1969
1969 establishments in New York (state)
Schuyler County, New York
Active rock radio stations in the United States